The Dodge Caravan (and the long-wheelbase Dodge Grand Caravan) is a series of minivans that was manufactured by Chrysler from the 1984 to 2020 model years. The Dodge version of the Chrysler minivans, the Caravan was marketed as both a passenger van and a cargo van (the only version of the model line offered in the latter configuration). For 1987, a long-wheelbase Dodge Grand Caravan was introduced (becoming the sole version of the model line from 2008 onward). Produced in five generations across 36 model years, Dodge Caravan is the second longest-lived Dodge nameplate (exceeded only by the Dodge Charger).

Initially marketed as the Dodge counterpart of the Plymouth Voyager, the Caravan was later slotted between the Voyager and the Chrysler Town & Country, eventually serving as the lowest-price Chrysler minivan, slotted below the Chrysler Pacifica. Sold primarily in the United States and Canada, the Dodge Caravan was also marketed in Europe and other international markets under the Chrysler brand (as either the Chrysler Voyager and Chrysler Caravan). In North America, a rebranded version of the model line was sold by Volkswagen from 2009 to 2014 as the Volkswagen Routan. Ram Trucks sold a cargo-only version of the model line as the Ram C/V Tradesman.

After the 2020 model year, the Dodge Grand Caravan was discontinued, ending production on August 21, 2020. For 2021 production, the Chrysler division revived the Grand Caravan for its namesake division, using it for a Canadian-market version of the Chrysler Pacifica (an identical vehicle was marketed as the Chrysler Voyager in the United States).

For its entire production run, the Dodge Caravan/Grand Caravan was manufactured by Chrysler Canada (now Stellantis Canada) at its Windsor Assembly facility (Windsor, Ontario). From 1987 until 2007, the model line was also manufactured by Chrysler at its Saint Louis Assembly facility (Fenton, Missouri). Since their introduction in late 1983, over 14.6 million Chrysler minivans have been sold worldwide (including export versions and versions sold through rebranding).

Background 
At the end of 1977, Chrysler commenced development on what would become the Chrysler minivans. Alongside the ability to park within a standard-height garage, designers sought to develop a vehicle with a low floor and car-like NVH levels. While front-wheel drive was sought out for the design, rear-wheel drive was still considered an alternative for cost reasons. Following the move of both Hal Sperlich and Lee Iacocca from Ford to Chrysler in late 1978, the Chrysler minivan design (codenamed T-115 at the time) adopted front-wheel drive.

While the Dodge Caravan (and Plymouth Voyager) shared no chassis underpinnings with the K-cars, the two model lines retained mechanical commonality, sharing engines and transmissions.

First generation (1984–1990) 

Originally slated for introduction as a 1982 model, the Dodge Caravan was introduced alongside the Plymouth Voyager in November 1983 for the 1984 model year.

Interior trim, controls, and instrumentation were borrowed from the Chrysler K platform, and with the lower floor made possible by the front-wheel-drive platform, the Caravan featured car-like ease of entry. Three trim levels were available: base, SE, and LE. The Caravan, along with the Plymouth Voyager, are considered to be the first mass-produced vehicles to have dedicated built-in cup holders.

Base vans came equipped for five passengers in two rows of seating. The LE came with seven passengers standard in three rows of seating. The base van had two bucket seats with attached armrests and open floor space between them in the front, a three-person bench seat in the second row. The seven-passenger came with two bucket seats with attached armrests and open floor space between them in the front, a two-person bench seat in the second row, and a three-person bench seat in the back row. The two bench seats in the rear were independently removable, and the large three-person bench could also be installed in the second-row location via a second set of attachment points on the van's floor, ordinarily hidden with snap-in plastic covers. This configuration allowed for conventional five-person seating with a sizable cargo area in the rear. The latching mechanisms for the benches were easy to operate although removing and replacing the seats typically required two adults. A front low-back 60/40 split-bench, accommodating a third front passenger in the middle, was offered in the SE trim level in 1985 only, allowing for a maximum of eight passengers. This configuration was subsequently dropped. Base model curb weight 2,910 lbs.

Safety features consisted of 3-point seat belts for the front two passengers, with simple lap belts for the rear five. Seats on base models and cloth-trimmed SEs had no headrests, which were not mandated due to the van's "light truck" legal status. However, the two front seats were equipped with non-adjustable headrests on the LE model and in conjunction with vinyl upholstery on the SE. Side-impact reinforcements were mandated and were at all seating positions front and rear. Neither airbags nor anti-lock braking systems were available.

Access to the rear rows of seating was by a large passenger-side sliding door enabling easy access in confined situations, e.g., parking. Because only one sliding door was offered, the smaller second-row bench seat was shifted to the driver's side of the van, facilitating passenger access to the 3rd-row seat. The seatback of the rear bench could also be folded forward, providing a flat cargo shelf. The smaller 2nd-row bench was not adjustable, nor foldable; it could only be removed entirely.

Cargo access to the rear was via a hatchback, similar to the one on the K platform station wagons. The hatch was hinged at the top and held open by gas struts.

A long-wheelbase variant, marketed as the Grand Caravan, was introduced in May 1987. It allowed more cargo space behind the rear seat.

A cargo version of the Caravan, called the Mini Ram Van, was also introduced for 1984, with a flat-floored cargo space four feet tall and with four feet between the wheel wells. It was renamed the Caravan C/V for 1989 and was then discontinued after 1995. It was initially available with a short wheelbase; a long-wheelbase variant was introduced alongside the Grand Caravan.

Unique to the Caravan C/V was the option of a traditional hatch door in the back or the optional swing-out bi-parting doors (with or without windows), similar to those of more traditional cargo vans. These doors were made of fiberglass. Also based on the Mini Ram and C/V were aftermarket conversion vans sold through official Chrysler dealers and from the conversion companies themselves.

Trim levels 
Base – Included: Vinyl upholstery, 5-passenger seating, warning chimes, cigar lighter, digital clock, manual locks, windows and mirrors, 15-gallon fuel tank, tinted windows, halogen headlamps, an AM/FM stereo with four speakers, vinyl steering wheel, and intermittent wipers.
SE – Added: Cloth upholstery, reclining front seats, rear assist strap, 20-gallon fuel tank, power liftgate release, tape stripes, and steel rims.
LE – Added: Cloth-and-vinyl upholstery, front and rear fascia, forward storage console, warning lights for door ajar, storage drawer, washer fluid warning, and power mirrors.

Transmissions 
Both a 3-speed TorqueFlite automatic transmission and a 5-speed manual were available with all inline-four engines, including the turbocharged 2.5-liter (this was a rare combination). The Plymouth Voyager, which was a rebadged version of the Caravan, was also available with a manual transmission. The Chrysler Town & Country, released in 1990, which was a more luxurious repackaged version of the Caravan, had no manual transmission option. Manual transmissions were not available on V6 models of the passenger Caravan, but were an option on the Mini Ram Van and Caravan C/V's long-wheelbase models with a 3.0 L V6.

The V6 engines were only offered with the venerable fully hydraulically operated TorqueFlite, until the computer-controlled Ultradrive 4-speed automatic became available in 1989. The Ultradrive offered better fuel economy and responsiveness, particularly when paired with the inline-four engine. However, it suffered from reliability problems, usually stemming from what is known as "gear hunt" or "shift busyness", resulting in premature wear of the internal clutches. It also required an uncommon type of automatic transmission fluid and is not clearly labeled as such, leading many owners to use the more common Dexron II rather than the specified "Mopar ATF+3", resulting in transmission damage and eventual failure. Early model transmissions would eventually be retrofitted or replaced with the updated versions by dealers under warranty.

Engines 
For the first three years of production, two engines were offered in the Caravan – both inline-four engines with 2-barrel carburetors. The base 2.2 L was borrowed from the Chrysler K-cars, and produced  horsepower. The higher performance fuel-injected version of the 2.2 L engine later offered in the K-cars was never offered in the Caravan, and the 2-bbl version would remain the base power plant until mid-1987. Alongside the 2.2 L, an optional Mitsubishi 2.6 L engine was available, producing  horsepower.

In mid-1987, the base 2.2 L I4 was replaced with a fuel-injected 2.5 L I4, which produced , while the Mitsubishi G54B I4 was replaced with the new fuel-injected 3.0 L Mitsubishi V6 producing  in March of that year.

Shortly thereafter in model year 1989, a more powerful engine became optional, with a turbocharged version of the base 2.5 L producing . Revisions to the Mitsubishi V6 upped its output to  that same year, and in 1990 a new  3.3 L V6 was added to the option list. The V6 engines became popular as sales of the 2.5 L turbo dwindled and it was dropped at the end of the year. In these years, the ES model debuted (short-wheelbase only) to highlight the new engines, the turbo 2.5 L in particular. The ES was introduced to the long-wheelbase Grand Caravan for 1991 and continued throughout 2003 before it was discontinued and replaced with the SXT.

 1984–1987 2.2 L K I4, 
 1984–1987 2.6 L Mitsubishi G54B I4, 
 1987½–1990 2.5 L K I4, 
 1987½–1988 3.0 L Mitsubishi 6G72 V6, 
 1989–1990 2.5 L K Turbo I4, 
 1989–1990 3.0 L Mitsubishi 6G72 V6, 
 1990 3.3 L EGA V6,

Second generation (1991–1995) 

For the 1991 model year, the second-generation Dodge Caravan was released. Intended as an extensive revision of the first generation, while the chassis underpinnings were carried over and updated, the only shared body panels were the front doors and the sliding door. To match the Ford Aerostar and General Motors APV minivans, designers sought to improve the exterior aerodynamics and the handling of the model line. To enhance safety, anti-lock brakes and all-wheel drive were introduced as options; as a first in the segment, a driver-side airbag became an option in 1991 (a first in the segment).

The model line again came in two lengths, with the long-wheelbase Grand Caravan making its return; the C/V cargo van also was part of the model line. The Caravan was further distinguished from the Voyager; along with different grilles and headlamp units, the Caravan received less chrome trim (limited to the grille and the Chrysler Pentastar hood ornament). Shedding its connection to the K-cars, the Caravan received its own dashboard design (though shared with the Voyager, the Caravan received its own steering wheel). On all but the base-trim Caravan, seven-passenger trim was standard. In addition to the two rear bench seats, the second generation introduced the option of middle-row bucket seats; in 1992, Chrysler introduced integrated child safety seats, an innovation in the segment.

For the 1994 model year, the Caravan underwent a mid-cycle revision as part of a body upgrade to meet 1998 federal safety standards. Though the exterior saw only minor changes to the bumpers and lower body side trim, the interior underwent larger changes, receiving new seats and door panels. Coinciding with the addition of a passenger-side airbag, the dashboard was redesigned. Following its declining popularity, the woodgrain trim option was discontinued in favor of monochromatic and two-tone exterior designs.

To commemorate the tenth year of production, Dodge offered the "10th Anniversary Edition" option package for 1994. Available on SE/LE trims of the Caravan and Grand Caravan, the 10th Anniversary Edition was an appearance package, combining a two-tone exterior (a light-gray lower body with selected upper body colors) with a gold front fender badge.

Trim levels 
Base – Included: cloth-and-vinyl upholstery, intermediate bench seat, tinted manual windows, power mirrors, intermittent windshield wipers and a rear wiper, glove box, and an AM/FM stereo.
SE – Added: power liftgate release, reclining front seats, and a rear bench seat.
LE – Added: heated mirrors, forward storage console, tachometer, oil pressure, and voltage gauges, an overhead console, power locks, rear defroster, speed control, storage drawer under the front passenger seat, and a tilt steering column.

Engines 
With the exception of the discontinued 150 hp 2.5 L turbocharged I4, the second-generation Caravan carried over its powertrain line from the 1990 Dodge Caravan. Shifting its powertrain commonality from the Dodge Aries to that of the larger Dodge Dynasty, a 2.5 L I4 was the standard engine, with a 3.0 L V6 and 3.3 L V6 as options. In 1994, the Caravan received a 3.8 L V6 (shared with the Chrysler Imperial/Fifth Avenue) as an option.

 1991–1995 2.5 L EDM (K) I4, 
 1991–1995 3.0 L Mitsubishi 6G72 V6, 
 1991–1993 3.3 L EGA V6, 
 1994–1995 3.3 L EGA V6, 
 1994–1995 3.8 L EGH V6,

Integrated child safety seats 
In 1991, Dodge introduced a second-row bench seat integrating two child booster seats on 1992 models. These seats continued as an available option through Generation V until they were discontinued in 2010.

Third generation (1996–2000) 

The third-generation Chrysler minivans were available in long- and short–wheelbase models; three- and four-door configurations; and eight different powertrains, including electric and compressed natural gas; on a single, flexible platform.

In development for nearly 5 years from early 1990 (full development from 1991) to December 26, 1994 (final design by Don Renkert was approved on September 23, 1991, and frozen in May 1992), the 1996 model was introduced at the 1995 North American International Auto Show using the Chrysler S platform. It included a number of innovations, including a driver's side sliding door (optional initially, to become standard equipment later), a first for Chrysler and a non-compact minivan for the United States and Canada. With Generation III, Chrysler introduced a seat management system marketed as Easy Out Roller Seats. A conventional door handle and lock was added to the rear hatch, eliminating the confusing pop-and-lift maneuver which had been required on earlier models.

Base models of the Caravan were offered in most states with either a 2.4 L four-cylinder or the 3.0 L Mitsubishi 6G72 V6 engine, except in several northeastern states, where the Mitsubishi did not meet emissions standards. In those areas, the 3.3 L engine was offered as the V6 option from 1997 through 2000.

The 1996 Caravan, along with the Plymouth Voyager and the Chrysler Town & Country won the North American Car of the Year award. The Caravan itself won Motor Trend magazine's Car of the Year 1996 and appeared on the Car and Driver Ten Best for 1996 and 1997. 1999 also saw the addition of a one-year only 15th anniversary "Platinum Edition", to mark Caravan's 15th year of production. This package was offered on various trim levels, and included Platinum Metallic paint, and fender badges. The 2000 model year offered packages that included the "2000+" and "Millennium" package; however, these were little more than unique fender badges on vans with popular equipment.

During the 1996 model year, running changes saw the elimination of the plastic intake manifold cover from the 3.8L engine and redesigned interior door panels. Changes for the 1997 model year were minor, adding traction control as an option or standard equipment, depending on trim level, along with the reintroduction of optional all-wheel drive. The Caravan received more minor updates in 1997 for the 1998 model year. These changes came in the form of new colors, new wheels for trims above SE, new interior fabric, optional heated seats, and automatic headlights on higher trim levels. In the calendar year 1998, the Caravan's HVAC vents on the driver's side and center of the dashboard were updated to have a more conventional design. Later that year, the 1999 Caravan received new front styling on all trims above SE, while the Sport and ES models received even sportier styling. The ES model was the first minivan to receive the "AutoStick" transmission and 17-inch wheels. A cargo net between the driver and front passenger seats was added. Color-keyed door and lift-gate handles were made standard on SE models, in addition to a new keyless entry remote. Base and SE models had options for a spoiler as well as color-keyed bumpers and trim (grey or color molded bumpers and trim were standard). The driver's side sliding door became standard. Chrysler had updates of the Plymouth Voyager in 1996 for the 1997 model year and the Chrysler Town & Country in 1997 for the 1998 model year, prior to the 1998–2007 DaimlerChrysler era; it was the only exterior update of the NS Dodge Caravan.

Trim levels 
Base – Included: Cloth upholstery, speed-sensitive wipers, manual locks, 14-inch steel rims with "Successor" hubcaps, and an AM/FM stereo with four speakers. Package 22T added air conditioning and cargo net.
SE – Added: air conditioning, power mirrors, speed control, rear defroster, power locks, sliding rear driver's side door, an AM/FM stereo with cassette player and four speakers, steering wheel audio controls, and 15-inch steel rims with "revolver" hubcaps. Package 28D added power front windows with automatic driver's side window, ignition delay, glove box, and an ashtray.
Sport – Added: tinted windows, and power windows with automatic driver's side window, fog lamps, and 16-inch steel rims with "Vortex" hubcaps.
LE – Added: optional leather seating surfaces, dual-zone air conditioning with temp control, overhead console with sunglass holder, garage door opener holder, illuminated entry, headlamp off delay, keyless entry, security alarm, power driver's seat, an AM/FM stereo with cassette player, steering wheel audio controls, graphic equalizer, Infinity 200-watt sound system and 10 speakers, center console storage bin, and 15-inch steel rims with "Citadel" hubcaps.
ES – Added: leather seating surfaces, fog lamps, automatic headlamps, garage door opener, heated power front seats, an AM/FM stereo with cassette and CD players, rear spoiler, and 16-inch "genesis" alloy rims.

Engines 
 1996–2000 2.4 L EDZ I4,  (Canadian vans beginning in 1999 included a 3.0 L V6 as standard equipment)
 1996–2000 3.0 L Mitsubishi 6G72 V6 ,  (not available in certain U.S. states, 3.3 L V6 offered as standard equipment in those states instead)
 1996–2000 3.3 L EGA V6, 
 1996–1997 3.8 L EGH V6, 
 1998–2000 3.8 L EGH V6,

Dodge Caravan EPIC 

In 1999, Dodge introduced the Caravan EPIC, a fully electric minivan. The EPIC was sold as a fleet-only lease vehicle. Production of the EPIC was discontinued in 2001. Only a few hundred of these vehicles were produced and sold. After the leases expired they were returned and crushed. Approximately 10 vans remain in private hands today.

Crash test results 
The 1996–2000 Dodge Grand Caravan received a "Marginal" rating in the Insurance Institute for Highway Safety's 40 mph offset test. The structural performance and restraints were graded "Acceptable", but the foot injuries were very high.

In the NHTSA crash tests, it received 4 stars for the driver and front passenger in the frontal-impact. In the side-impact test, it received 5 stars for the driver, and 3 stars for the rear occupant, and resulted in a fuel leak that could cause a fire hazard.

Concepts 
Other plans for this generation included three minivan concepts to be made in the Windsor Assembly, the Dodge Caravan R/T, Voyager XG, and the Chrysler Pacifica 1999 concept. It had large air intakes and driving lights in the front bumper, a brushed aluminum instrument panel, racing-style pedals, and black and white rubber flooring. The Voyager XG was more rugged, featured a diesel engine and manual transmission, and included many outdoor amenities, such as a built-in ice pack. The Chrysler Pacifica, based on the Town & Country, was more luxurious, had power leather seats and footrests, overhead bins and lighting, an LHS grille, and roof-long skylights. The Pacifica actually did come to be in 2004, based on the fifth-generation Caravan, except that it became a crossover SUV rather than a minivan; the nameplate was eventually applied to a minivan in 2016.

Easy-Out Roller Seats 
In 1995, Dodge introduced a system of seats to simplify installation, removal, and re-positioning, marketed as Easy-Out Roller Seats. When installed, the seats are latched to floor-mounted strikers. When unlatched, eight rollers lift each seat, allowing it to be rolled fore and aft. Tracks have locator depressions for rollers, to simplify installation. Ergonomic levers at the seatbacks release the floor latches single-handedly, without tools, and raise the seats onto the rollers in a single motion. Additionally, seatbacks were designed to fold forward. Seat roller tracks are permanently attached to the floor and seat stanchions are aligned, facilitating the longitudinal rolling of the seats. Bench seat stanchions were moved inboard to reduce bending stress in the seat frames, allowing them to be lighter.

When configured as two and three-person benches (available through Generation IV), the Easy Out Roller Seats could be unwieldy. Beginning in 2000, second and third-row seats became available in a 'quad' configuration – bucket or captain chairs in the second row and a third-row three-person 50/50 split "bench" – with each section weighing under . The Easy-out system remained in use through Generation V – where certain models featured a two-person bench and the under-floor compartments from the Stow'n Go system.

All the rebadged nameplate variants of the Chrysler minivans use the Easy Out Roller Seats on their second-row seating, where not the Stow and Go system.

Fourth generation (2001–2007) 

Unveiled at the 2000 North American International Auto Show (NAIAS) on Monday, January 10, 2000, the redesigned 2001 Dodge Caravan and 2001 Chrysler Town & Country were released for sale in August 2000. The release was part of a promotional tie-in with Nabisco, which unveiled their new "Mini Oreos" inside the van during the unveiling. The first vans rolled off the line at the Windsor Assembly Plant on July 24. The fourth generation vans were available in the trim levels; SE, Sport, SXT, AWD Sports, "base" model, AWD Choice, eL, C/V, ES, EX, AWD Wagon, and SXT All-Wheel-Drive.

In development from February 1996 to December 1999, the Generation IV minivans were based on the Chrysler RS platform and featured a larger body frame with modified headlights and taillights. Design work was done by Brandon Faurote from January 1997 and reached production approval in 1998.

In addition to other detailed changes, power sliding doors and a power hatch became available as options. The Mitsubishi 3.0 L V6, which no longer met emissions standards in California and the northeastern U.S., was discontinued, and a more powerful 3.8 L engine, based on the 3.3 L, became available. All Wheel Drive continued to be offered on high-end models. Other innovative available features included remote-operated sliding doors and a rear hatch, which could be opened and closed at the push of a button, either inside the vehicle or with the keyless entry fob.

In the 2002 model year, DaimlerChrysler stopped using the "DODGE" badges on the front doors, like with all Dodge vehicles.

In 2003, the Caravan C/V and Grand Caravan C/V returned after having been discontinued in 1995. The C/V featured the option of deleted side windows (replaced by composite panels), optional rear seats, a cargo floor made of plastic material similar to pickup truck bedliners, rubber flooring in lieu of carpeting, and a normal hatch at the rear. Minor changes were made to the Grand Caravan ES including many of the features included in Option Group 29S becoming standard, the 17-inch Titan chrome wheels no longer being an option replaced with standard 16-inch chrome wheels, and the disappearance of the AutoStick Transmission option. This year also saw the appearance of an optional factory-installed rear-seat DVD system with a single-disc player mounted below the HVAC controls.

The 2004 model year offered an exclusive one year only "Anniversary Edition" package to mark Caravan's 20th year in production. This package was offered on higher-level SXT models and included chrome wheels, body-color moldings, special interior accents, as well as a unique fender badge.

The 2005 model year came very early, starting production in January 2004. Changes for 2005 included a revised grille, new foglight fascia, and a system of in-floor folding second and third-row seats, marketed as Stow 'n Go seating.

Production of this generation continued in China from 2008, when the Taiwanese Chrysler Town & Country production line was relocated there, until late 2010 when the fifth generation Chrysler Voyager was introduced to the Chinese market. The Caravan was subsequently replaced by the Journey, although a page for the Caravan still exists on the Dodge China site. The Chinese Caravan was produced alongside the Town & Country, now using the Grand Voyager nameplate, by Soueast, and did not share any aesthetic components with the North American Caravan aside from the wheels. Instead, the Chinese Caravan was identical to the Taiwanese Town & Country, aside from the lack of chrome trim on the exterior door panels, and used a modified version of the Town & Country front bumper with a Dodge grille. Chinese vans were equipped with Mitsubishi 6G72 engines and came in three trim levels: Classic, SXT, and Luxury.

Trim levels 
SE – Included: Cloth upholstery, grocery bag hooks, manual air conditioning, tinted windows, manual locks, an AM/FM stereo with cassette player and four speakers (later, a single-CD player replaced the tape deck), and 15" steel rims with "Kinetic" hubcaps. Later standard features were sliding door alert (hazards flash when opening), and 15" steel rims with "Interface" hubcaps.
SE Plus (Grand Caravan only) – Added: power mirrors, sound insulation, keyless entry, illuminated entry, power front windows, and rear vents,
Sport – Added: an overhead console, rear defroster, sunscreen glass, speed control, power locks, floor mats, tachometer, power heated mirrors, an AM/FM stereo with cassette player and 6 speakers, power windows, and 15-inch "crossfire" hubcaps. Package 25H added dual-zone air conditioning, glove box and ashtray lights, headlamp off delay. Package 25K added an AM/FM stereo with single-CD and cassette players and 6 speakers, power sliding doors, and a power driver's seat. Later replaced by the SXT package.
SXT – Added (from SE Plus): Three-zone air conditioning, power driver's seat, fog lamps, power sliding doors, HomeLink garage door opener, an AM/FM stereo with single-CD/cassette players and 6 speakers, tachometer, and 16-inch "Ingot" alloy rims.
ES – Added: three-zone air conditioning, a trip computer, fog lamps, driver's side power sliding door, garage door opener, an AM/FM stereo with cassette player, in-dash 4-disc CD changer with Infinity sound system, and 16-inch "europa" alloy rims.

Engines 

IIHS results 
The 2001 model of this version earned a "Poor" rating in the Insurance Institute for Highway Safety's 40 mph offset test. It did protect its occupants reasonably well, and the dummy movement was well controlled, however, a fuel leak occurred. Chrysler corrected this problem starting with the 2002 models, moving it up to an "Acceptable" rating.

The 2006 model year brought optional side curtain airbags and a stronger B-pillar, which was tested by the Insurance Institute for Highway Safety's side-impact crash test. With the side airbags, it got an "Acceptable" rating. For the driver, there is a chance of serious neck injuries, rib fractures, and/or internal organ injuries. The rear passengers, however, could leave this accident unharmed, as there is a low risk of significant injury in a crash of this severity for them.

Stow 'N Go seating 
In 2004, Dodge introduced a system of second- and third-row seating that folded completely into under-floor compartments. It was marketed as Stow 'N Go and was available exclusively on long-wheelbase models.

In a development program costing $400 million, engineers initially used an Erector Set to visualize the complex interaction of the design and redesigned under-floor components. The system included the spare tire well, fuel tank, exhaust system, parking brake cables, rear climate control lines, and rear suspension but precluded all-wheel drive (AWD).

The Stow 'n Go system received the Popular Science Magazine's "Best of What's New" for 2005 award, and was never offered on the Volkswagen Routan, the rebadged nameplate variant of the Chrysler minivans.

For the model year 2011, Chrysler revised the system, rebranding it as "Super Stow 'n Go". New pivoting head restraints with taller seatbacks and a revised folding mechanism (marketed as "single action") improved stowage ease – with the head restraints folding on themselves automatically and the entire seat automatically folding down to a position just over its floor recess.

Fifth generation (2008–2020) 

The fifth-generation Dodge minivan had debuted at the 2007 North American International Auto Show with exterior styling by Ralph Gilles. Beginning with Generation V in the model year 2008, Chrysler only made the long-wheelbase Grand Caravan. With the discontinuation of the short-wheelbase Caravan, Dodge offered the Journey on nearly an identical wheelbase and as a crossover rather than a minivan. Although the SWB model, which had accounted for half of all sales in Canada, cost approximately $2,000 less and offered a four-cylinder engine option with improved fuel economy, Chrysler executives stated the SWB Caravan was discontinued to accommodate new features offered in the Grand Caravan, consistent with the demands of the majority of the minivan market.

A new six-speed automatic transmission became standard with the 3.8 L V6 and the new 4.0 L V6. The four-speed automatic transmission is standard with the 3.3 L Flex-Fuel V6. This generation of Grand Caravan and its Town & Country counterpart were not available with an all-wheel-drive system. The previously unavailable Electronic Stability Control was made standard on this generation.

Chrysler introduced a seat management system marketed as Swivel'n Go seating, the MyGIG entertainment system (a stereo with a built-in hard drive for recording, storing, and playing music), second and third-row video screens, powered second-row windows, standard side curtain airbags, and dashboard-mounted transmission controls. The gear shift lever moved to the instrument panel, the location used by competitors.

The market shifted briefly away from minivans and SUVs with the gasoline price spikes of the earlier part of 2008. This trend began to reverse itself in the fall of 2008. During 2009 and 2010 the Dodge Grand Caravan continued to be the top-selling minivan in Canada, with over 60% of the market's monthly sales.

Automotive News reported that, from January to October in 2010, Dodge sold about a third of its 2010 Grand Caravans to rental fleets. The relatively high rental fleet sales depressed used vehicles' resale value: as the number of returned ex-rental 2010 Grand Caravan to the market jumped fourfold between July to October, prices of used 2009 and 2010 Dodge minivans dropped by as much as 20%.

The Dodge Grand Caravan was discontinued after the 2020 model year because of "regulatory reasons". It was reported that the cost of updating the vehicle to meet new federal safety regulations is so high that it would eliminate its low price advantage.

Trim levels 
SE – Included: Cloth upholstery, 16-inch steel wheels with hubcaps, overhead console with observation mirror, sunglass bin (not available if equipped with sunroof), power locks, power windows with automatic driver's side window, sliding door alert system (hazards flash for 10 seconds when opened), manual sliding doors, manual mirrors, air conditioning (manual temperature control), floor console, and an AM/FM stereo with a single-CD player, MP3 capability, auxiliary input jack and four speakers.
SXT Added: power sliding doors, power heated mirrors, automatic front windows, power second-row windows, rear power vents, a rear overhead console, universal garage door opener, LED lighting with rear overhead swivel lamps, leather-wrapped steering wheel with audio controls, power driver's seat, Stow N Go, an AM/FM stereo with single-CD/DVD player with MP3 capability, 20 GB HDD, backup camera and 6 speakers, and 16-inch alloy rims.
SXT Premium Added: Chromed exterior mirrors and chrome-striped side molding, 17-inch alloy rims, power sunroof

Engines 

Both the 3.8 L and 4.0 L engines were paired with Chrysler's 62TE 6-speed automatic transmission with variable line pressure (VLP) technology (See Ultradrive#62TE).

In Canada (2008–2010) the 3.3 L was the standard engine across the range, combined with the 4-speed 41TE automatic transmission. The 4.0 L engine and the six-speed combination was available as an option on only the top of the range SXT models. In 2011 the six-speed transmission was specified as standard on the Town & Country.

Swivel 'n Go seating 
Dodge introduced a seating system for 2008, marketed as Swivel 'n Go. In the seating system, two full-size second row seats swivel to face the third row. A detachable table can be placed between the second and third-row seats. The Swivel 'n Go seating system includes the third-row seating from the Stow 'n Go system. The system is offered on the Dodge Grand Caravan and Chrysler Town & Country, but not the Volkswagen Routan, a rebadged nameplate variant of the Chrysler minivans.

These Swivel 'n Go Seats are manufactured by Intier, a division of Magna. The tracks, risers, and swivel mechanisms are assembled by Camslide, a division of Intier. The swivel mechanism was designed by and is produced by Toyo Seat. The swivel mechanism includes bumpers that stabilize the seat while in the lock position. When rotated the seat comes off these bumpers to allow easy rotation. The seat is not meant to be left in an unlocked position or swiveled with the occupant in it, although this will not damage the swivel mechanism.

The "Swivel 'n Go" feature was discontinued after the 2010 model year.

Model history

2009 model year 
For 2009, standard Stow 'n Go seats were added that folded flat into the rear area floor to create more cargo room, while the Swivel 'n Go seats turned 180 degrees to face the third row. The available SXT trim now included new technology options. New for 2009 was an optional "sport" suspension system as well as a blind-spot warning system and "Cross Path Detection" with sensors to warn of cars or other obstacles when backing out of a parking space.

2010 model year 
The Chrysler minivans became the only domestic brand minivans as GM and Ford replaced their slow-selling models with three-row crossover SUVs.

Changes for the 2010 Dodge Grand Caravans included new active head restraints for the driver and front passenger on all models, three-zone manual climate controls for the Grand Caravan SE, and a new 3.16 final drive ratio for models equipped with the 4.0-liter engine.

2011 model year 

The Grand Caravan underwent a mid-cycle refresh for the 2011 model year, which included major changes in both styling and functionality. The suspension was heavily re-tuned, with both Dodge and Chrysler minivans gaining a larger front sway bar and new rear sway bar, increased rear roll center height, adjusted spring rates, a new steering gear, a revised front static camber setting, and lowered ride height. This improved handling.

All three of the former engine choices were replaced by the new Pentastar 3.6-liter V6 with 6-speed automatic transmission, now the sole powertrain choice for all models. Interior trim was restyled on both vans, in addition to major exterior revisions highlighted by the new "double-crosshair" grille on the Grand Caravan. The Grand Caravan no longer had its own distinct headlight assemblies and now shared a common design with the Town & Country.

Other changes included extra sound insulation, acoustic glass, new seats, softer-touch surfaces, new LED ambient lighting and center console, and halogen projector headlamps with LED accents. The Chrysler models were adjusted so that instead of competing against equivalent Dodge trim levels, they were above Dodge in trim and features.

2012 model year 
For 2012, a new, basic style trim called "AVP" was introduced, while some features previously unavailable for "SE" (like touch navigation panel) become available as options (The "SE" now also received a floor console, similar to the one available for "SXT"). The same year, the front logo design was changed gaining the two slanted rectangles in red to match the rest of the Dodge lineup. For 2013, the American Value Package "AVP" trim manufacturer's suggested retail price (MSRP) was reduced by $1,000 from the year before.

2013 model year 
The Grand Caravan added a class-exclusive feature with an optional Blu-Ray DVD player while the base "AVP" model was described by Autotrader.com editors as having a "shockingly low MSRP" giving buyers "incredible utility" in their vehicle.

2014 model year 

For the 2014 model year, three new packages are introduced: American Value Package (US), Canada Value Package (Canada), Blacktop package (US only), and the 30th Anniversary Edition. They are all different sets of the SE and SXT trims and include new luxury features for the same price. The Grand Caravan AVP also gained easy-clean floor mats that came with the optional second-row Stow'n Go seats (standard on SE, SXT, and R/T).

The "Blacktop Package", based on SE and SXT, came equipped with 17-inch polished aluminum wheels with gloss black pockets, a gloss black grille, black headlamp bezels, an all-black interior including headliner, door panels and console, unique black cloth seats and door trim panels with silver accent stitching, a leather-wrapped steering wheel with silver accent stitching and a leather shift knob, choice of 6 body colors (Granite Crystal, Billet Silver, Brilliant Black, Maximum Steel, Redline Red, Bright White). SXT models also include fog lamps.

The "SE 30th Anniversary Edition", based on the SE trim, came equipped with 17-inch satin carbon aluminum wheels, body-color heated exterior mirrors, 30th Anniversary badging on the front fenders, silver accent stitching and piano black accents throughout, black cloth seats, a black leather-wrapped steering wheel, black leather-wrapped shift knob, black headliner and overhead console, bright heating and air conditioning trim bezels, power second- and third-row windows, and 30th Anniversary logo on the key fob

The "SXT 30th Anniversary Edition", based on the SXT trim, was packaged with 17-inch polished aluminum wheels with satin carbon pockets, bright chrome roof rack, bright window trim moldings, fog lamps, automatic headlamps, and special 30th Anniversary badging, Black Torino leatherette seats with premium suede inserts and silver accent stitching, power 10-way driver's seat, piano black accent trim bezels, and bright chrome accents throughout.

Both 30th Anniversary Editions included an available special body color, Granite Crystal Pearl Coat, a customized gauge cluster with 30th Anniversary badging, as well as the UConnect Handsfree Group (SiriusXM Satellite Radio with a one-year subscription, Bluetooth streaming audio and voice command and an auto-dimming rear view mirror). The vehicles arrived at dealerships at Q3 2013.

Also new for the 2014 model year, the Grand Caravan R/T gained standard auto headlamps with black bezels and the Security Group featuring remote start and security alarm.

2015 model year 
The Grand Caravan was not changed for the 2015 model year except for content features added to SE Plus and SXT Plus trims. The SE Plus package included black leather upholstery, power windows for the second-row seats, and Chrysler's Uconnect voice command with Bluetooth sound system.

2016 model year 
The new Chrysler Pacifica was unveiled on January 11, 2016, and getting all the attention, but the Dodge Grand Caravan continued to be marketed as a budget minivan alternative.

2017 model year 

A small 2017 model year update was applied to SE, SE Plus, SXT, and GT (replacing the R/T) models. The 6.5-inch Touchscreen (Radio 430 and 430 NAV) became standard equipment with rear-view cameras on all models. (Navigation is standard on GT and optional on SXT.) The GT model also included monochromatic exterior and premium leather interior with red accent stitching

Sales of the Grand Caravan began in Mexico during this model year, positioned as the most accessible minivan in its class. Three models available in the Mexican market were SE, SXT and SXT Plus.

FCA unveiled the Chrysler Pacifica, a new minivan for the 2017 model year, at the 2016 North American International Auto Show. The Pacifica replaced the Chrysler Town & Country, but it was originally stated that the 2016 model of the Dodge Caravan would be produced for one more model year as a lower-cost alternative to the Pacifica, before being discontinued. In January 2017, FCA CEO Sergio Marchionne stated that it was not clear if the Caravan would be discontinued, and that they would have to look into offering "some level of affordable access to the Pacifica at the lower end to try and replace the outgoing models" (this would eventually come in the form of the sixth-generation Voyager, which was briefly produced alongside the RT Caravan). Despite the introduction of the higher-cost Pacifica model, sales of the Caravan increased by 26% in 2016. A substantial number of Caravans are sold to low-margin rental fleets. The vehicle continues to be positioned for price-conscious customers and it draws traffic to dealerships when the vehicle is aggressively priced. Additionally, FCA provided various rebates and incentives to assist purchases of the Grand Caravan and other models by customers with credit scores of less than 620.

According to a report by an automotive journalist, this strategy helps the Chrysler Pacifica hold its value better while also having a more affordable minivan available. Over 60% of the Dodge Caravan's sales goes to fleet sales and the vehicle was the second best selling vehicle for rental fleet sales.

2018 model year 

Production of Grand Caravans was temporarily suspended from September to November 2017 with the assembly of the 2018 model year versions starting in December 2017. The production line required changes to install airbags that meet U.S. Federal Motor Vehicle Safety Standard 226 calling for larger and more robust side-impact air curtains, as well as for them to deploy in the event of either a side-on collision or a rollover. Beginning with the 2018 models, changes included advanced multistage driver and front-passenger airbags that include low-risk deployment, a driver's-side inflatable knee blocker, front seat-mounted side airbags, and side-curtains for outboard passengers in all three rows.

For 2018, the Grand Caravan was Dodge's best-selling vehicle while the sales of foreign-branded minivans fared worse than the Dodge in 2018. Sales in Canada dropped 30 percent, significantly lower than in the previous six years.

2019 model year 

The 2019 model year marked the 35th anniversary of the Chrysler minivans. A commemorative trim option was available on the SE and SXT models that included a bright grille, 17-inch "tech silver" aluminum wheels, a 35th Anniversary fender badge as well as "piano black" console and instrument panel accents and front floor mats with 35th Anniversary embroidered logo. A "Blacktop Package" featuring a black grille, headlamp bezels as well as an all-black interior was optional on SE and SXT 35th anniversary edition models.

The minivan market segment decreased in general. Sales of the Grand Caravan models in Canada declined by 9% during the first quarter of 2019, but it was still number 10 among the best-selling vehicles for that period in Canada. Most sales went to the rental and on fleet customers. The vehicle has not received major changes, but continues to be produced because "Dodge sold more than 125,000 Grand Caravans last year [2018], while Honda only sold 100,000 of its Odyssey minivans during the same year [2018]."

The third shift at Windsor minivan plant ended in October 2019 due to sluggish sales, eliminating 1,500 direct jobs.

2020 model year 

Three models were available: SE, SE Plus, and SXT. The Grand Caravan SE Plus model now included standard second-row Super Stow 'n Go bucket seats, a power eight-way driver seat, and an all-black interior with cranberry wine accent stitching on the seats. The optional "Blacktop Package" continued for the SE Plus and SXT models.

The Canadian market included six models starting from an entry-level version and then increasing the standard equipment on each: CVP, SXT, SXT Premium Plus, Crew, Crew Plus, and the GT which includes many convenience features as well as a performance suspension system and a monochromatic exterior. The "Blacktop Package" trim option is available on SXT models.

Trim levels for the Mexican market were unchanged from previous model years with SE, SXT and SXT Plus models available.

Safety 
In the U.S. the National Highway Traffic Safety Administration's (NHTSA) New Car Assessment Program crash testing, the 2020 Dodge Grand Caravan achieved an overall four star rating.

Variants

Europe 

As with preceding generations, Chrysler marketed the Caravan in Europe as the Chrysler Voyager, with the fifth-generation becoming exclusively sold as the long-wheelbase Grand Voyager. From 2007 to June 2011, the model line was sold under the Chrysler brand; following the acquisition of Chrysler by Fiat, the Voyager was rebranded as a Lancia in continental Europe (with the Chrysler Voyager remaining in Ireland and the UK).

The Chrysler/Lancia Voyager was marketed under three trim lines distinct to Europe (Silver, Gold, and Platinum). The standard engine was a 2.8 L I4 diesel (producing 161 hp), with a 3.6 L gasoline V6 (producing 279 hp); both engines were paired to a 6-speed automatic.

Following the 2016 model year, exports of the Voyager were discontinued as Fiat Chrysler reorganized its brands, with Chrysler remaining largely in North America and Lancia sold exclusively in Italy.

Ram Cargo Van (Ram C/V Tradesman) 

For the 2012 model year, the Ram Trucks division received the Dodge Grand Caravan C/V cargo van, renaming it the Ram Cargo (C/V) Tradesman (reviving the name used by Dodge for its full-size cargo vans during the 1970s). In contrast to its predecessor, the Tradesman was strictly a two-seat vehicle, with solid metal body paneling in place of rear windows and a flat rear load floor.

As the Ram brand increased its use of Fiat-based vehicles, the Tradesman was replaced for 2016 by the ProMaster City, an American-market version of the Fiat Doblò.

Volkswagen Routan 

After a five-year hiatus, Volkswagen re-entered the minivan segment in North America by introducing the Volkswagen Routan for the 2009 model year. Replacing the Transporter T4 (1992, 1999–2003 EuroVan) in North America, the Routan was sold in the United States, Canada, and Mexico. Targeting approximately 5% of the sales within the minivan segment, Volkswagen entered into a 5-year production agreement with Chrysler.

The Routan was manufactured by Chrysler at its Windsor Assembly facility alongside the Grand Caravan and Town & Country, styled with its model-specific interior trim and front and rear exterior fascias. While sharing powertrains with the Grand Caravan, the Routan was given its own suspension tuning and seating configurations (the last Chrysler-designed minivans with lift-out seats). As part of the 2011 update of the Chrysler minivans, the Grand Caravan received the stiffer suspension tuning previously used by Volkswagen; while receiving the 3.6 L V6, the Routan carried over much of its interior.

Falling far under sales expectations, the final Routans were produced by Chrysler in August 2012; all 2013 sales were from dealer inventory, with 2014 vehicles sold exclusively to fleets. Originally predicting to sell 50,000 units per year, Volkswagen sold 57,683 Routans through its four years of production. As Volkswagen shifted to SUVs in North America, the Routan minivan was replaced for 2018 by the three-row Atlas (also replacing the Touareg in North America).

Discontinuation 

For 2017, Chrysler introduced its sixth-generation minivan, with the Chrysler Pacifica replacing the Chrysler Town & Country. Initially slated to end production following the 2016 model year, the Dodge Grand Caravan would live on through the 2020 model year. Although introduced in 2008, FCA marketed the model line below the Pacifica as Dodge version continued fleet sales and its also popularity in Canada.

After scheduling in February 2020 for production to end in May 2020, FCA later extended the date by three months to end assembly on August 22. In production for nearly 37 years (13 years as the fifth-generation RT platform), the final Dodge Grand Caravan rolled off the Windsor, Ontario, Canada assembly line on August 21, 2020.

For 2021, Chrysler revived both the Voyager and Caravan nameplates under the Chrysler brand. Replacing entry-level trims of the Pacifica minivan, the Voyager is sold in the United States while the Grand Caravan is marketed in Canada. The two vehicles differed only in nameplates, but Chrysler retained the "Grand" extended-length prefix for the Grand Caravan (despite offering only a single length of minivans since 2008)

Sales

Notes

External links 

 Official 2011 Dodge Grand Caravan website
 Owner's Manual (5th generation)

All-wheel-drive vehicles
Caravan
Flexible-fuel vehicles 
Front-wheel-drive vehicles
Minivans
Cars introduced in 1983
Cars discontinued in 2020